Vladimir Monomakh was an armoured cruiser built for the Imperial Russian Navy during the 1880s. The vessel was named after Vladimir II Monomakh, Grand Prince of Kiev. She spent most of her career in the Far East, although the ship was in the Baltic Sea when the Russo-Japanese War began in 1904. Vladimir Monomakh was assigned to the Third Pacific Squadron and participated in the Battle of Tsushima in May 1905. She was tasked to protect the Russian transports and was not heavily engaged during the daylight portion of the battle. The ship was torpedoed during the night and was scuttled the following morning by her captain to prevent her capture by the Japanese.

Design and description
Vladimir Monomakh was classified as a semi-armored frigate and was an improved version of the preceding . The ship was designed with high endurance and high speed to facilitate her role as a commerce raider able to outrun enemy battleships. She was laid out as a central battery ironclad with the armament concentrated amidships. The iron-hulled ship was fitted with a ram and was sheathed in wood and copper to reduce fouling. Her crew numbered approximately 550 officers and men. The ship displaced  at deep load.

The ship had two vertical compound steam engines, each driving a four-bladed, manganese-bronze  propeller. To reduce drag while under sail, her funnels were retractable.

Vladimir Monomakh was armed with four  guns, one at each corner of the battery that were sponsoned out over the sides of the hull. Eight of the dozen  guns were mounted between the eight-inch guns in the central battery and the remaining four were outside the battery at the ends of the ship. Anti-torpedo boat defence was provided by four 9-pounder and ten Hotchkiss guns. The ship was also equipped with three above-water  torpedo tubes.

The ship's waterline belt was composed of compound armour and extended the full length of the ship. The sponsons of the 8-inch guns were equally thick.

Career
Construction began on Vladimir Monomakh on 22 February 1881 at the Baltic Shipyard in St. Petersburg, although the formal keel-laying ceremony was not held until 21 May. She was launched on 22 October 1882 and completed on 13 July 1883. The ship's total cost was 3,348,847 rubles. Although the second vessel to be laid down in the Dmitri Donskoy class, Vladimir Monomakh was completed first. Due to constant changes during construction, the design of both vessels diverged considerably by the time of completion. The ship was named after Vladimir II Monomakh, Grand Prince of Kiev.

On 11 October 1884, Vladimir Monomakh began a leisurely voyage from the Baltic Sea to the Far East. She made port visits in Kristiansand, Norway and Portland Harbour, England before reaching Malta on 25 November. The ship spent most of the next six weeks in Greek waters before arriving at Port Said, Egypt on 12 January 1885 to transit the Suez Canal. Vladimir Monomakh encountered the British ironclad battleship  there and was followed by her all the way to Japan as tensions were rising between Great Britain and Russia in early 1885. The ship arrived in Nagasaki in March 1885 and was appointed flagship of the Russian Pacific Fleet under Rear Admiral A.E. Kroun. Based out of Vladivostok, she normally wintered in warmer waters. For example, Vladimir Monomakh visited Manila, Singapore, Hong Kong, Batavia, Dutch East Indies and Penang Island between November 1885 and March 1886. She returned to Kronstadt in 1887 and was refitted in 1888.

Vladimir Monomakh departed Kronstadt for the Mediterranean on 6 November 1889 where she remained for the next year. She joined the official escort for the Tsarevich Nicholas II's visit to the Far East. The two ships reached Singapore on 2 March 1891, and reached Vladivostok on 23 May. Once at Vladivostok, Captain Oskar Stark was appointed commander of the ship and Vladimir Monomakh was overhauled through August. She wintered over again at Nagasaki, departing for Europe on 23 April 1892 and reached Kronstadt in August, where the ship was given a thorough refit beginning on 22 September. The heavy sailing rig was replaced by three signal masts, her funnels were fixed in place, and her boilers were also upgraded. Vladimir Monomakh was reclassified as a 1st Class Cruiser on 13 February 1892.

On 2 October 1894 the ship, now under the command of Captain Zinovy Rozhestvensky, was ordered back to the Mediterranean. In view of the First Sino-Japanese War of 1894–95, the Council of Ministers ordered on 1 February 1895 that the Mediterranean Squadron reinforce the 2nd Pacific Squadron. She reached the Chinese treaty port of Chefoo on 16 April and became the flagship of Rear Admiral Yevgeni Ivanovich Alekseyev, 2nd in command of the Pacific Fleet, on 13 May. Vladimir Monomakh remained at Chefoo until late in the year before sailing to Vladivostok and then to Kobe, Japan in January 1896.

The ship only remained there for a short time before she was ordered back to Kronstadt for a major modernization. Her obsolete 8-inch and 6-inch guns were replaced with five new 45-calibre 6-inch and six  Canet guns. The ship's six original boilers were replaced by a dozen cylindrical boilers.

Vladimir Monomakh was transferred back to the Pacific Fleet in November 1897 and reached Nagasaki in February 1898. After the Triple Intervention expelled the Japanese from Port Arthur, Vladimir Monomakh was part of the Russian force which subsequently occupied that strategic harbor. In June 1900, she transported troops involved in the suppression of the Boxer Rebellion. In September 1900, on her return to Port Arthur, she accidentally rammed and sank the merchant vessel Crown of Aragon. In December 1901, she rendezvoused with Dmitri Donskoy at Hong Kong, and the two ships returned to the Mediterranean via the Suez Canal. Vladimir Monomakh remained in the Mediterranean until August 1902, and reached Kronstadt in October.

Russo-Japanese War

In February 1905, Vladimir Monomakh was assigned to the Third Pacific Squadron, which was sent to reinforce Admiral Zinovy Rozhestvensky's Second Pacific Squadron. The Third Pacific Squadron transited the Suez Canal and joined the 2nd Pacific Squadron at Cam Ranh Bay in French Indochina on 14 May 1905 where she was assigned to the Cruiser Division commanded by Rear Admiral Oskar Enkvist.

At the decisive Battle of Tsushima on 27 May 1905, Vladimir Monomakh was positioned to the right side of the Russian line of battle, guarding the transports and so avoided the pounding that the other vessels of Second Pacific Squadron received, although she engaged the Japanese cruiser . The Japanese ship was hit several times and driven off, but only three crewmen were killed and seven wounded. Vladimir Monomakh was hit several times itself and had one 120 mm gun destroyed and its crew killed. The most dangerous hit was a shell that burst over a 6-inch shell hoist and started an ammunition fire. The prompt flooding of the magazine averted an explosion.

At nightfall, the Japanese torpedo boats engaged the surviving Russian warships and the cruiser claimed to have sunk one of her attackers at 8:25 p.m. Vladimir Monomakh, mistaking one of her attackers for a Russian destroyer, was hit around 8:40 by a single torpedo which ruptured her hull near the No. 2 coal bunker, but sank the torpedo boat. The damage was severe but her crew kept her afloat and her engines operational, although she continued to take on water. The next morning, however, Vladimir Monomakh headed towards Tsushima Island and began to unload her wounded into her surviving boats. Captain Vladimir Aleksandrovich Popov gave the order to abandon ship, and ordered the seacocks to be opened to scuttle the vessel rather than surrender it to the Japanese. The ship sank at 10:20 a.m. and the crew was captured by the Japanese auxiliary cruisers IJN Sado Maru and IJN Manshū. Vladimir Monomakh was officially removed from the navy list on 28 September 1905.

Notes

Footnotes

References
 

 

Ships built at the Baltic Shipyard
1882 ships
Cruisers of the Imperial Russian Navy
Naval ships of Russia
Russo-Japanese War cruisers of Russia
Maritime incidents in 1905
Shipwrecks in the Sea of Japan
Shipwrecks of the Russo-Japanese War
Scuttled vessels